Antoni de Falguera i Sivilla (1876 in Barcelona – 1947) was a Catalan architect. He was a student of Josep Puig i Cadafalch.

Gallery

References

Architects from Catalonia
People from Barcelona
1876 births
1947 deaths